The 2018 Bill Beaumont County Championship Division 1 was the 118th version of the annual, English rugby union, County Championship organised by the Rugby Football Union (RFU) for the top tier English counties.  Each county drew its players from rugby union clubs from the third tier and below of the English rugby union league system (typically National League 1, National League 2 North or National League 2 South).  The counties were divided into two regional sections (each divided into two pools, for a total of four) with the winners of each meeting in the final held at Twickenham Stadium.  Lancashire are the reigning champions having defeated Cornwall in the previous year's final.

Once again Lancashire finished as winners of the northern group stage with a 100% record to qualify for their second successive final, although group runners-up Yorkshire could feel aggrieved as they also had a 100% record, but lost out on points for/against.  It showcased a real weakness in the new competition format as neither county had faced each other over the past two years, despite being the best sides in the northern group.  Lancashire were joined by Hertfordshire who took advantage of a slip-up by Gloucestershire at Surrey to win the southern group and cement their place in the final - the county's first since 2012.  By contrast last season's finalists Cornwall had a dire campaign, managing only one draw in their three games and finishing bottom of their group.  Unlike Yorkshire, Cornwall can thank the RFU for the new format as promotion/relegation is over two seasons, saving Cornwall from the drop due to their excellent tournament the previous season.

In the Twickenham final Lancashire finished as deserving champions beating Hertfordshire 32-16, with 22 points coming from the boot Chris Johnson who also finished as the competition's top points scorer, while a try from his team-mate, Anthony Bingham, made him the top try scorer with 5 tries.  It was the 25th cup win for a Lancashire side that has dominated the competition through its history.  Relegated sides from the 2018 competition included East Midlands from the north and Surrey from the south.  In Surrey's case they had actually looked safe, having finished a point clear of relegation rivals, Devon, but ultimately went down due to a 2 points deduction for fielding an ineligible player in their 15-15 draw with Cornwall earlier in the campaign. In East Midlands case they actually finished 3rd overall in the northern group competition over the two seasons but decided to take voluntary relegation due to difficulties in getting the top eligible clubs in their union to provide players for future competitions.  Both East Midlands and Surrey will play in the 2019 Bill Beaumont County Championship Division 2 next season.

Competition format

The 2018 Bill Beaumont County Championship Division 1 consists of twelve county sides, with six counties in the northern group, and six in the southern group.  Each county plays three games per group, which means that some counties get two home games, and the others just the one home game.  The RFU have taken fixtures from the previous year into account so that county sides that only played one home game in that competition now get two games and vice versa.  At the end of the group stage the top teams with the best record from each group (north and south) advance to the final held on 27 May 2018 at Twickenham Stadium.

A continuation from the 2017 competition is that promotion/relegation occurs every two seasons instead of one, with points accumulated over the two seasons (2017 and 2018) taken into consideration.  The two lowest ranked counties (one from the north/one from the south) will be relegated into the 2019 Bill Beaumont County Championship Division 2 competition, with the two highest aggregate ranked sides of that tournament being promoted to take their place.

Participating Counties and ground locations

Group stage

Division 1 North

Round 1

Round 2

Round 3

Division 1 South

Round 1

Round 2

Round 3

Final

Relegation aggregate table

In order to determine relegation to the 2019 Bill Beaumont County Championship Division 2, results from the 2017 and 2018 competitions will be combined, with the lowest ranked team from each group being relegated.

Total season attendances
Does not include final at Twickenham which is a neutral venue and involves teams from all three county divisions on the same day

Individual statistics
 Note that points scorers includes tries as well as conversions, penalties and drop goals.  Appearance figures also include coming on as substitutes (unused substitutes not included).  Statistics also include final.

Top points scorers

Top try scorers

Competition records

Team
Largest home win — 50 points
50 - 0 Hertfordshire at home to Cornwall on 19 May 2018
Largest away win — 44 points
64 - 20 Lancashire away to Northumberland on 5 May 2018
Most points scored — 64 points (2)
Lancashire away to Northumberland on 5 May 2018
Lancashire at home to Cheshire on 19 May 2018
Most tries in a match — 10
Lancashire away to Northumberland on 5 May 2018
Most conversions in a match — 8
Lancashire at home to Cheshire on 19 May 2018
Lancashire at home to Eastern Counties on 12 May 2018
Most penalties in a match — 5
Lancashire versus Hertfordshire at Twickenham on 27 May 2018
Most drop goals in a match — 1
Lancashire versus Hertfordshire at Twickenham on 27 May 2018

Attendances
Highest — 1,515
Cornwall at home to Devon on 12 May 2018
Lowest — 150
Northumberland at home to East Midlands on 19 May 2018
Highest Average Attendance — 1,183
Cornwall
Lowest Average Attendance — 163
Kent

Player
Most points in a match — 22
 Chris Johnson for Lancashire versus Hertfordshire at Twickenham on 27 May 2018
Most tries in a match — 3
 Anthony Bingham for Lancashire at home to Cheshire on 19 May 2018
Most conversions in a match — 8
 Chris Johnson for Lancashire at home to Cheshire on 19 May 2018
Most penalties in a match — 5
 Chris Johnson for Lancashire versus Hertfordshire at Twickenham on 27 May 2018
Most drop goals in a match — 1
 Chris Johnson for Lancashire versus Hertfordshire at Twickenham on 27 May 2018

Notes

See also
 English rugby union system
 Rugby union in England

References

External links
 NCA Rugby

2018